The R359 road is a regional road in Ireland stretching north-south for 16 km between Mountbellew and Woodlawn in County Galway. En route it passes through Castleblakeney and Ballymacward.

See also
Roads in Ireland
National primary road
National secondary road

References
Roads Act 1993 (Classification of Regional Roads) Order 2006 – Department of Transport

Regional roads in the Republic of Ireland
Roads in County Galway